Kendall is an unincorporated community in Hamilton County, Kansas, United States.

History
The frontiersman Charles "Buffalo" Jones, who in 1879 had co-founded Garden City, left from Kendall in 1886 on a hunt to try to capture remaining buffalo to prevent their looming extinction. Kendall has a post office with ZIP code 67857.

Education
Kendall is a part of USD 494 Syracuse.

Kendall schools were closed through school unification. The Kendall High School mascot was Kendall Bobcats.

See also
 Santa Fe Trail

References

Further reading

External links
 Hamilton County maps: Current, Historic, KDOT

Unincorporated communities in Hamilton County, Kansas
Unincorporated communities in Kansas
Kansas populated places on the Arkansas River